The  is a  north-south bound railway line in Nara Prefecture, Japan, owned and operated by the Kintetsu Railway, a private railway operator. It connects Yamato-Saidaiji Station and Kashiharajingu-mae Station.

Service outline
Most Express and Limited Express trains operate to and from the Kyoto Line, and some Express services operate between Kyoto and Tenri via the line between Saidaiji and Hirahata stations.

Stations
Local trains stop at every station.

History
The first section of the line, from Saidaiji Station (present-day ) to Kōriyama Station (present-day ), opened on 1 April 1921.

See also
 List of railway lines in Japan

References

Kashihara Line
Rail transport in Nara Prefecture
Standard gauge railways in Japan
Railway lines opened in 1921
1921 establishments in Japan